Haqq is a surname of Arabic origin commonly found in the Indian subcontinent but also in other parts of the Muslim world.

Etymology
Haqq originates from the Arabic word for truth or reality. It is commonly used as a suffix of a personal name. Al-Haqq (The Ultimate Reality) is one of the Names of God in Islam, and used in the second half of a compound name, commonly succeeding Abd or Abdul to make Abdul Haq. This specific compound name, means "servant of the Truth", and gives rise to the Muslim theophoric names.

Notable countries with the surname 
 In Afghanistan - Haq, Ul-Haq, Al-Haq, Haque, Haqqani 
 In Bangladesh - Haq, Hoq, Huq, Hague, Hogue, Haque, Hoque, Huque, Ul-Haque
 In India - Haq, Haque, Ul-Haque
 In Iran - Haq, Haqq, Haqeq, Haqeqe, Haqqani
 In Malaysia - Haq, Haque, Ul-Haque
 In Pakistan - Haq, Haqq, Haque, Ul-Haq, Ul-Haque, Haqqani

Notables with the surname

Haq
Zia ul Haq (1924–1988) Former President of Pakistan and Former Army chief of Pakistan
 Aaminah Haq (born 1972), Pakistani model
 Ameerah Haq, Bangladeshi diplomat
 Fazle Haq (1928–1991), Pakistani general and governor of Khyber-Pakhtunkhwa province
 Gad al-Haq (1917–1996), Grand Imam of Al-Azhar
 Gary Haq, British human ecologist
 Inzamam-ul-Haq (born 1970), Pakistani cricketer
 Iram Haq (born 1976), Pakistani-Norwegian actress and filmmaker
 Kiran Haq (born 1988), Pakistani actress and model
 Mahbub ul Haq (1934–1998), Pakistani economist
 Mansurul Haq (1937–2018), Pakistani former admiral
 Mehr Abdul Haq (1915–1995), Pakistani linguist
 Misbah-ul-Haq (born 1974), Pakistani cricketer
 Nawaz Haq (born 1981), Pakistani athlete
 Nomanul Haq, Pakistani-American historian
 Qazi Imdadul Haq (1882–1926), Bangladeshi writer
 Sami-ul-Haq (1937–2018), Pakistani religious scholar
 Shameemul Haq (born 1955), Indian politician
 Ubaidul Haq, (former) Bangladeshi khatib of Baitul Mukarram
 Waheedul Haq (1933–2007), Bangladeshi writer and journalist
 Wahidul Haq (1933–2020), Bangladeshi politician

Haque
 Adil Ahmad Haque, international law scholar
 Ariful Haque Choudhury, Mayor of Sylhet, Bangladesh
 Art Malik (né Athar ul-Haque Malik, British-Pakistani actor, born 1952)
 Enamul Haque, former cricketer for Bangladesh
 Fareed Haque (musician, born 1963 to Pakistani father and Chilean mother)
 Fazal Haque, Afghan cricketer
 Intisar-ul-Haque (1935–1996, Pakistani philosopher)
 Mohammad Asrarul Haque (born 1942, Indian politician)
 Muhammad Nurul Haque, Bangladeshi cultural activist, social worker and writer
 Md.Mozammel Haque (1860–1933, Bangladeshi poet and novelist)
 Naeem Haque, Pakistani model and actor
 Rashida Haque Choudhury, former Bangladeshi Minister of State of Social Welfare
 Syed Shamsul Haque (1935–2016, Bangladeshi poet and writer)
 Syed Aminul Haque, Pakistani Politician, member of the National Assembly of Pakistan
 Tafazzul Haque Habiganji (1938–2020), former vice-president of Hefazat-e-Islam and Jamiat Ulema-e-Islam
 Ziaul Haque (Pakistani scholar of economic history and Islamic studies, died 1998)
 Zulkiflee Anwar Haque (Malaysian cartoonist, born 1962)

Hoque
Aminul Hoque, goalkeeper for Bangladeshi football club Muktijoddha Sangsad KS
Aminul Hoque MBE, British-Bangladeshi writer and lecturer at Goldsmiths, University of London
Anisul Hoque, Bangladeshi writer
Ehsan Hoque, American-Bengali doctor
Farzana Hoque, Bangladeshi cricketer
Kazi Shamsul Hoque, Bangladeshi journalist
Mazibul Hoque, Bangladeshi politician
 Moinul Hoque Choudhury, five-time MLA, two-time UN General Assembly representative and Indian Minister of Industrial Development
Najrul Hoque, Indian-Bengali politician
Rabiul Hoque, Bangladeshi cricketer
Saiful Hoque, Bangladeshi politician
Zohurul Hoque, Bangladeshi Islamic scholar
Zubair Hoque, British-Bangladeshi racer

Huq
 Abul Kasem Fazlul Huq (1873–1962), Bangladeshi statesman in the first half of the 20th century
 Konnie Huq, British television presenter
 Nasreen Pervin Huq (1958–2006), Bangladeshi women's activist and campaigner for women's rights and social justice
 Nazmul Huq (1938–1971), Bangladeshi commander
 Nurul Huq Bhuiyan, Bangladeshi professor and politician
 Rupa Huq, British politician and sister of Konnie
 Muhammad Shamsul Huq (1912–2006), Bangladeshi academic and former Minister of Foreign Affairs
 Shamsul Huq, Bengali politician

See also
Abdul Haq
Aminul Haque (name)
Anisul Huq
Anwar ul Haq
Azizul Haque
Fazlul Haq
Inam-ul-Haq (includes "Enamul Haq" etc.)
Izhar ul Haq (disambiguation)
Mozammel Haque (disambiguation)
Nur ul-Haq (disambiguation)
Serajul Huq (disambiguation)
Shams ul Haq

Surname oddities 

There are quite a few surnames found throughout Middle Eastern & South Asian countries that have also been known as ethnic European surnames
Haque - A common last name in Saudi Arabia, Pakistan, India, and Bangladesh is also known as an ethnic English surname dating back all the way to the 1670s. English Haque seemed to have originated from the Durham-Yorkshire region of the United Kingdom and it is believed to be a variant of the Hague surname which is still common in both the UK and the United States present day. The English Haque surname slowly became outnumbered by South Asian Haque's as more and more Muslims began immigrating to the UK in the latter part of the 1900s. There are records of English Haques in the United States from websites such as myHeritageDNA and Ancestry.com dating back to the 1800s.

Organizations 
 Haque Academy, co-educational school based in the Defence Housing Authority in Karachi, Pakistan

References

Arabic-language surnames
Bengali Muslim surnames
Indian surnames